Kelly Marie Cheng (Claes) (born September 18, 1995) is an American beach volleyball player. She and her partner Sara Hughes won the bronze medal at the 2013 U19 World Championships, the silver medal at the 2014 U21 World Championships, and back-to-back NCAA Championships in 2016 and 2017.

Early life 

Claes was born in Fullerton, California to Paul, a former San Diego State baseball player, and Quincy. She played high school volleyball at El Dorado High School in Placentia, California where she was awarded All-CIF Division 1A and Orange County Register All-Orange County first team honors.   

Claes, along with partner Sara Hughes, won the bronze medal at the 2013 FIVB Beach Volleyball U19 World Championships and the silver medal at the 2014 FIVB Beach Volleyball U21 World Championships.

College 

Claes began playing volleyball at the University of Southern California with partner Alexa Strange in 2014. During her sophomore year she rejoined former partner Sara Hughes and won the AVCA Pairs National Championship. Claes was named a 2015 AVCA All-American. During their junior and senior years Claes and Hughes led the USC Trojans to back-to-back NCAA Championships in 2016 and 2017. In 2016, Claes won the inaugural Pac-12 Player of the Year award along with Pac-12 Pair of the Year and the Pac-12 Pairs Championship with Hughes. Claes graduated from USC in 2017 with a degree in sociology.

Professional career 

In her first year as a professional, Claes won her first AVP Gold Series Championships in Chicago with college partner Sara Hughes. The duo became the youngest team to win an AVP event. Hughes split from Claes in early 2018. Claes then teamed up with Sarah Sponcil. The duo won the silver medal at the 2019 FIVB four-star event in The Hague and then qualified for the 2020 Olympics in Tokyo after winning gold medals in Sochi and Ostrava.

References

External links
 
 

1995 births
Living people
American women's beach volleyball players
USC Trojans women's beach volleyball players
Beach volleyball players at the 2020 Summer Olympics
21st-century American women